The Whitfield Estates–Broughton Street Historic District is a U.S. historic district in Sarasota, Florida. It includes 7207, 7211, 7215, 7219 and 7316 Broughton Street, and contains 8 historic buildings. On October 29, 1993, it was added to the U.S. National Register of Historic Places.

References

External links

 Manatee County listings at National Register of Historic Places
 Manatee County listings at Florida's Office of Cultural and Historical Programs

Buildings and structures in Sarasota, Florida
National Register of Historic Places in Sarasota County, Florida
Historic districts on the National Register of Historic Places in Florida